Dan Dufour (born October 18, 1960) is a former American football guard. He played for the Atlanta Falcons from 1983 to 1984.

References

1960 births
Living people
American football offensive guards
UCLA Bruins football players
Atlanta Falcons players